Rollie Eggmaster is a kitchen appliance manufactured by Florida-based company Kedem LLC. It is described as a "vertical grill" that cooks eggs into a sausage-shaped omelette. The appliance excretes tube-shaped cooked eggs.

References

External links

Cooking appliances
Eggs (food)